Rahman Bacchus Gajraj, CBE (11 May 1910 – 23 February 2004) was a Guyanese politician and lawyer. He served as Speaker of the National Assembly of Guyana from 1961 to 1964 and 1968 to 1971. He also served as Mayor of Georgetown and as a diplomat, serving as High Commissioner to India and Canada. He died in Toronto, Ontario, Canada in 2004.

He was appointed a CBE in the 1965 New Year Honours List.

References

20th-century Guyanese lawyers
Guyanese politicians
1910 births
2004 deaths
Ambassadors of Guyana to the United States
High Commissioners of Guyana to Canada
High Commissioners of Guyana to India
Commanders of the Order of the British Empire
Guyanese emigrants to Canada
Mayors of places in Guyana
Speakers of the National Assembly (Guyana)